Phetchabun is one of Thailand's seventy-six provinces (changwat) lies in lower northern Thailand. Neighbouring provinces are (from north clockwise) Loei, Khon Kaen, Chaiyaphum, Lopburi, Nakhon Sawan, Phichit and Phitsanulok.

Geography and climate
Phetchabun is in the lower northern region of Thailand, in the area between the northern and the central region. The province lies in the broad fertile river valley of the Pa Sak River, with mountains of the Phetchabun mountain range to the east and west.

National parks
There are a total of four national parks, along with six other national parks, make up region 11 (Phitsanulok) of Thailand's protected areas. 
 Thung Salaeng Luang National Park, 
 Nam Nao National Park, 
 Khao Kho National Park, 
 Tat Mok National Park,

Wildlife sanctuaries
There are three wildlife sanctuaries, ofwhich two are in region 11 (Phitsanulok) and Phu Luang is in region 8 (Khon Kaen) of Thailand's protected areas.
 Phu Luang Wildlife Sanctuary, 
 Tabo–Huai Yai Wildlife Sanctuary, 
 Phu Pha Daeng Wildlife Sanctuary, 
Phetchabun especially Khao Kho is a place with good weather and cold all year round. Therefore, received the nickname "Switzerland of Thailand".

Toponymy
The word phetcha originates from the Sanskrit word vajra meaning "diamond" (or weapon of Indra), and the word bun from Sanskrit purna meaning "full", "perfect" or "whole". Hence the name of the province literally means "perfect diamond".

Initially, the province was called "Phe-cha-buth" as "Phuenchapura", which means the city that has plenty of crops. The reason is that the province is very fertile and has ample resources. Because of the fertility of the land, Phetchabun has always been agriculturally productive area.

History
Phetchabun was established by two kingdoms: the Sukhothai Kingdom, and the Ayutthaya Period of the King Narai.

In the Thesaphiban administrative reforms at the beginning of the 20th century, the province, together with Lom Sak province to the north, formed monthon Phetchabun. As it was the smallest monthon, it was also the first monthon to be dissolved in 1915, after being temporarily administered from Monthon Phitsanulok between 1903 and 1907. Lom Sak province was abolished and merged into Phetchabun in 1932.

From 1968 - 1982 communist insurgents established bases in the mountains in the province. From hidden locations they fought occasional skirmishes against the Thai Army.

Symbols
The provincial seal shows a diamond on a mountain, as diamonds are found in the province. In the foreground are tobacco plants, as it is one of the crops grown in the province. The provincial tree is the tamarind. Craspedacusta sowerbyi, a rare species of freshwater jellyfish is the provincial aquatic animal. Because Phetchabun is one of the few places in the world, that is the habitat of this species of invertebrates.

Economy
Tourism is considered the main industry of the province.

Phu Thap Boek, the highest mountain in the province, is a well-known tourist destination. The area surrounding it is the largest cabbage-growing area in Thailand.

Transport

Road
Phetchabun is 346 kilometres from Bangkok by using Route 1 and Route 21.

Air
Phetchabun is served by Phetchabun Airport. Nok Air serves the airport with flights to Bangkok.

Administrative divisions

The province is divided into 11 districts (amphoe). These are further divided into 117 subdistricts (tambon) and 1261 villages (muban).

Local government
As of 26 November 2019 there are: one Phetchabun Provincial Administration Organisation and 25 municipal (thesaban) areas in the province. Phetchabun, Wichian Buri and Lom Sak have town (thesaban mueang) status. Further 22 subdistrict municipalities (thesaban tambon). The non-municipal areas are administered by 102 Subdistrict Administrative Organisations - SAO (ongkan borihan suan tambon).

Human achievement index 2017

Since 2003, United Nations Development Programme (UNDP) in Thailand has tracked progress on human development at sub-national level using the Human achievement index (HAI), a composite index covering all the eight key areas of human development. National Economic and Social Development Board (NESDB) has taken over this task since 2017.

Local products
 Sweet tamarind
 Arabica coffee
 Khao lam (sticky rice in bamboo)
 Black galingale
 Stevia tea
 Thai vermicelli rice noodles
 Cabbage
Poultry
Tobacco

Notable people
Saensak Muangsurin (b. 1950–2009), boxer
Khaosai Galaxy (b. 1959), boxer, member of the International Boxing Hall of Fame
Kaokor Galaxy (b. 1959), boxer
Chana Porpaoin (b. 1966), boxer
Songkram Porpaoin (b. 1966), boxer
Sujin Naknayom (b. 1979), footballer
Chakrit Buathong (b. 1985), footballer
Sittisak Tarapan (b. 1984), footballer

References

External links

 Phetchabun Tourist information
Website of province (Thai)
Maps & attractions in Phetchabun

 
Provinces of Thailand